Brahian de Jesus Peña Roque (born 3 April 1994) is a Swiss athlete specialising in the sprint hurdles. Until 2011 he represented the Dominican Republic. He competed at the 2016 World Indoor Championships without advancing

Competition record

References

1994 births
Living people
Swiss male hurdlers
Swiss people of Dominican Republic descent
Sportspeople of Dominican Republic descent
Place of birth missing (living people)
European Games competitors for Switzerland
Athletes (track and field) at the 2019 European Games
21st-century Swiss people